"When This Cruel War Is Over", also known under the title "Weeping, Sad and Lonely", is a song written by Charles Carroll Sawyer with music by  Henry Tucker. Published in 1863, it was a popular war song during the American Civil War, sung by both Union and Confederate troops.

"When This Cruel War Is Over" is in the key of G major and consists lyrically of four rhyming verses and a couplet refrain. Rhythmically, it conforms to the style of the sentimental ballads of the day, and its chorus was suited to arrangement for male a cappella groups. Lyricist Charles Sawyer was also known for his popular song "Who Will Care for Mother Now", while composer Henry Tucker was perhaps best known as the melodist of the song "Sweet Genevieve".

The song was published in several editions both in the North and the South, and was better known as "When This Cruel War Is Over" in the South and as "Weeping, Sad and Lonely", its opening line, in the North. In Southern editions, the first verse's reference to a "suit of blue" was changed to "suit of gray" and the rhyme adjusted to fit the new word. The song's fourth verse makes reference to the Union flag; this was also altered in Southern editions to refer to the Confederate flag instead. During the war, it sold more than one million copies, and was one of the most popular tunes of its era.

Historian Willard Heaps called the ballad "by far the most popular sweetheart 'separation' song in both the North and South." Bruce Catton wrote of the song, "it expressed the deep inner feeling of the boys who had gone to war so blithely in an age when no one would speak the truth about the reality of war: war is tragedy, it is better to live than to die, young men who go down to dusty death in battle have been horribly tricked." At one point, the Army of the Potomac was forbidden from performing the song on grounds that it fomented desertion, but soldiers mostly ignored the order, and it was quickly withdrawn. Contemporaneous sources mostly championed the tune, with the Cleveland Leader calling it "the greatest musical success ever known in this country ... [its] melody catches the popular ear and the words touch the popular heart."

The tune's popularity led Confederate songwriter John Hill Hewitt to write an answer song, titled "When Upon the Field of Glory". A lyric sung to the same melody, called "When This Cruel Draft Is Over", lamented the plight of potential draftees, and later in the war, lyrics to this tune praising George McClellan, and championing him as a presidential candidate to succeed Abraham Lincoln, were written under the title "Shouting 'Mac' and Freedom". The tune also inspired one Sergeant Johnson of the 54th Massachusetts Infantry to write lyrics to the tune as a prisoner of war, entitled "Down in Charleston Jail". Other answer songs or parodies included "Yes, I Would the War Were Over" (by Sep Winner), "I Remember the Hour When Sadly We Parted", "When This War Is Over, I Will Come Back To Thee", "The War Is Nearly Over", "Yes, Darling, Sadly I Remember", and "When the Lonely Watch I'm Keeping".

Lyrics

References

Sheet Music
IMSLP

 1863 songs
 Songs of the American Civil War